Torodora longilobella is a moth in the family Lecithoceridae. It was described by Kyu-Tek Park in 2002. It is found in Thailand.

The wingspan is about 18 mm. The forewings are orange white, densely speckled with dark brown scales. There is a small costal spot before the middle, a small spot at the middle of the cell and reniform stigmata near the end of the cell.

Etymology
The species name refers to the long lobes of the juxta in the male genitalia.

References

Moths described in 2002
Torodora